Blade Runner 2049 is a 2017 American epic neo-noir science fiction film directed by Denis Villeneuve and written by Hampton Fancher and Michael Green. A sequel to the 1982 film Blade Runner, the film stars Ryan Gosling and Harrison Ford, with Ana de Armas, Sylvia Hoeks, Robin Wright, Mackenzie Davis, Dave Bautista, and Jared Leto in supporting roles. Ford and Edward James Olmos reprise their roles from the original film. Gosling plays K, a Nexus-9 replicant "blade runner" who uncovers a secret that threatens to destabilize society and the course of civilization.

Ideas for a Blade Runner sequel were first proposed in the 1990s, but licensing issues stalled their development. Andrew Kosove and Broderick Johnson obtained the film rights from Bud Yorkin. Ridley Scott stepped down as the film's initial director and worked as an executive producer, while Villeneuve was later appointed to direct. Blade Runner 2049 was financed through a partnership between Alcon Entertainment and Sony Pictures, as well as a Hungarian government-funded tax rebate. Warner Bros., on behalf of Alcon, distributed the film in North America, while Sony handled distribution in international markets. Principal photography took place mostly at two soundstages in Budapest over four months from July to November 2016.

Blade Runner 2049 premiered in Los Angeles on October 3, 2017, and was released in the United States in 2D, 3D, and IMAX on October 6, 2017. The film received acclaim from critics, who praised its performances, direction, cinematography, editing, musical score, production design, visual effects, and faithfulness to the original film. It was widely considered among the best films of 2017. However, it became a box-office bomb, grossing $267.5million worldwide against a production budget between $150–185million. Blade Runner 2049 was nominated for and won several accolades: at the 90th Academy Awards, the film won Best Cinematography and Best Visual Effects, and was nominated for Best Production Design, Best Sound Editing, and Best Sound Mixing. It also received eight nominations at the 71st British Academy Film Awards, including Best Director, and won Best Cinematography and Best Special Visual Effects.   A sequel series, Blade Runner 2099, is in development at Amazon Studios, with Scott set to return as executive producer.

Plot 

In 2049, 30 years following the events of Blade Runner, bioengineered humans known as replicants are slaves. K (short for his serial number, KD6-3.7), a Nexus-9 replicant, works for the Los Angeles Police Department (LAPD) as a "blade runner", an officer who hunts and "retires" (kills) rogue replicants. He retires Nexus-8 replicant Sapper Morton and finds a box buried under a tree at Morton's protein farm. The box contains the remains of a female replicant who died during a caesarean section, demonstrating that replicants can reproduce biologically, previously thought impossible. K's superior, Lt. Joshi, fears that this could lead to a war between humans and replicants. She orders K to find and retire the replicant child to hide the truth.

K visits the headquarters of the Wallace Corporation, the successor to the defunct Tyrell Corporation in the manufacture of replicants. Wallace staff members identify the deceased female from DNA archives as Rachael, an experimental replicant designed by Dr. Eldon Tyrell. K learns of Rachael's romantic ties with former blade runner Rick Deckard. Wallace Corporation CEO Niander Wallace wants to discover the secret to replicant reproduction to expand interstellar colonization. He sends his replicant enforcer Luv to steal Rachael's remains and follow K to Rachael's child.

At Morton's farm, K finds 6.10.21 carved into the tree trunk and recognizes it from a childhood memory of a wooden toy horse. Because replicant memories are artificial, K's holographic A.I. girlfriend Joi believes this is evidence that K was born, not created. He searches LAPD records and discovers twins born on that date with identical DNA aside from the sex chromosome, but only the boy is listed as alive. K tracks the child to an orphanage in ruined San Diego but discovers the records from that year to be missing. K recognizes the orphanage from his memories and finds the toy horse where he remembers hiding it.

Dr. Ana Stelline, a replicant memory designer, confirms that the memory of the orphanage is real, leading K to conclude that he is Rachael's son. At LAPD headquarters, K fails a post-traumatic baseline test, marking him as a rogue replicant; he lies to Joshi by implying he killed the replicant child. Joshi gives K 48 hours to pass the baseline test or he will be 'retired.' Joi hires Mariette, a prostitute replicant, as a surrogate for Joi to have sex with K. Mariette, who is part of the replicant freedom movement, leaves a tracker on K. At Joi's request, K reluctantly transfers her to a mobile emitter so he cannot be tracked through her console memory-files. He has the toy horse analyzed, revealing traces of radiation that lead him to the ruins of Las Vegas. He finds Deckard, who tells him that he is the father of Rachael's child and scrambled the birth records to protect the child's identity; Deckard left the child in the custody of the replicant freedom movement.

Luv kills Joshi and tracks K to Las Vegas. She kidnaps Deckard, destroys Joi, and leaves K to die. Using Mariette's tracker, the replicant freedom movement rescues K. When their leader, Freysa, tells him that she helped deliver Rachael's child and that the child was a girl, K understands that he is not Rachael's child, deduces that Stelline is her daughter and that the memory of the toy horse is hers, one she implanted amongst those of other replicants whose memories she designed. To prevent Deckard from leading Wallace to Stelline or the freedom movement, Freysa asks K to kill Deckard for all replicants' greater good.

Luv takes Deckard to Wallace Corporation headquarters to meet Wallace. Wallace offers Deckard a clone of Rachael in exchange for revealing what he knows. Deckard refuses, and Luv kills the clone. As Luv transports Deckard to be tortured and interrogated off-world, K intercepts Luv's shuttle and tries to rescue Deckard. He fights Luv and ultimately drowns her, but he is mortally wounded. He stages Deckard's death to protect him from Wallace and the replicant freedom movement before taking Deckard to Stelline's office and handing him her toy horse. As K lies on the steps, looking up at snow falling from the sky, Deckard enters the building and meets his daughter for the first time.

Cast 

Archival footage, audio, and stills of Sean Young from the original film are used to represent both her original character of Rachael and a clone of the character created by Niander Wallace. Young's likeness was digitally superimposed onto Loren Peta, who was coached by Young on how to recreate her performance from the first film. The voice of the replicant was created with the use of a sound-alike actress to Young. Young was credited for her work.

Production

Development 

From the 1990s, licensing disputes over Philip K. Dick's 1968 novel Do Androids Dream of Electric Sheep? had deterred the creation of sequels to the science fiction drama Blade Runner (1982). Director Ridley Scott conceived two ultimately unrealized projects vaguely connected to the Blade Runner canon in the interim. Scott's second project, a collaboration with his son Luke and younger brother Tony titled Purefold, had been imagined as an episodic webseries examining conceptions of empathy.

Nearly three decades after the film's release, Alcon Entertainment co-founders Andrew Kosove and Broderick Johnson purchased the intellectual property from producer Bud Yorkin. The terms of Alcon's acquisition prohibited the remake of the original Blade Runner film, but entitled the company rights to syndication, franchising, and derivative media such as prequels and sequels. No longer satisfied with the profits of their smaller-budget features, and with investor funding scarce, Kosove and Johnson sought to increase Alcon's output of blockbuster films: "If you don't have repetitive cash flow, which is a fancy way of saying being in the sequel business, you are going to be in trouble eventually." Progress on a new Blade Runner feature soon accelerated when Kosove named Christopher Nolan one of his ideal choices to direct. However, Nolan said he never planned to direct, despite being an admirer of the Blade Runner franchise.

By August 2011, Alcon announced Ridley Scott's signing as the film's director to the press. The British filmmaker had long desired a sequel to expand upon the subject matter. After securing Scott's services, the studio assigned Michael Green and a returning Hampton Fancher the responsibility for writing the script. Alcon producers provided some insight of their vision but were unsure of how to approach the Blade Runner story, hence they and the normally candid Scott were tight-lipped when questioned further about the sequel's artistic direction in interviews conducted during the pre-production. Ultimately, Scott resigned from his duties once his existing commitment to Alien: Covenant (2017) took precedence, and retained partial oversight as an executive producer. He also made significant contributions to the screenplay, albeit in an uncredited role.

Blade Runner 2049 was Alcon's second collaboration with director Denis Villeneuve, who they called for a meeting at a cafe in rural New Mexico to negotiate an offer. They had an existing professional relationship from Prisoners (2013). Villeneuve credits Blade Runner for inspiring his passion for filmmaking, but hesitated to accept the assignment at first as he feared tarnishing the franchise's legacy. Nevertheless, he liked the screenplay and was assured by Fancher's investment in the project. Villeneuve preserved elements of the original film by modernizing Blade Runner retrofuturistic onscreen world, which he saw as imperative for an authentic story.

A scene from Steven Spielberg Ready Player One (2018) set in the Blade Runner universe was excluded from the film's finished cut. Spielberg had sought copyright approval during the filming of Blade Runner 2049, which Alcon producers refused as they feared the explicit reference would affect their commercial prospects, even though Ready Player One was released months later.

Casting 

Harrison Ford and Ryan Gosling were Blade Runner 2049s first significant casting choices. Gossip about Ford's participation had been circulating in the media since the project's conception, claims which the producers initially denied, having only approached the actor for a part in 2014. Alcon did not publicly announce their signing until the following year. Ford had expressed interest in reprising his role in past interviews and was enthusiastic about the Blade Runner 2049 script. The working conditions on set was another aspect of the production Ford was pleased with, in contrast to the stressful shooting environment endured on Blade Runner. Ford stated the thirty five-year passage of time, plus the synthesis of a new story with Deckard's already-established backstory, lent context necessary to playing his aged character. The only other returning Blade Runner actor, Edward James Olmos, appears in a supporting part which pivots the main story.

The screenwriters tailored K specifically for Gosling, but it was the opportunity to work with Villeneuve and experienced cinematographer Roger Deakins, paired with his faith in the script, that convinced the actor to join Blade Runner 2049 in his first leading role in a blockbuster production. Gosling developed a reputation for his discriminating film choices; the prospect of working on big-budget franchise sets never enticed him, yet he trusted the filmmakers' instincts, and the thematic complexity of the script furthermore reassured his decision. A longtime Blade Runner fan, the actor said his first viewing experience of the film as a young teenager was profound, remarking, "It was one of the first films I had seen where it wasn't clear how I was supposed to feel when it was over. It really makes you question your idea of the hero and the villain, the idea of what it means to be human." Blade Runner 2049 proved challenging for Gosling because of the production's scope.

Ana de Armas auditioned several times before landing the film's female lead. De Armas was an actress of national renown in Spain, aspiring to break into English-speaking roles. After working in her first Hollywood film in Hands of Stone (2016), she settled in Los Angeles in pursuit of a role that did not typecast her ethnicity. De Armas underwent four months of rigorous speech training to master her English before auditioning. Once the studio commenced production of Blade Runner 2049, the actress said her fitness training provided the necessary mental space to prepare for the intense shooting schedule.

Villeneuve considered David Bowie, one of the franchise's core influences, for the part of Niander Wallace, but the musician died before filming began. Instead, he and the producers looked at Jared Leto, fresh off the filming of Suicide Squad (2016) because they felt he exuded Bowie's rockstar sensibility. Leto refrains from naming specific sources that shaped certain aspects of his character's persona; rather the actor cites real-life friends who work in tech as a general influence. Leto is notorious in the film industry for his unorthodox preparation for his roles, and he continued his unusual practices in Blade Runner 2049 by wearing custom opaque contact lenses to work the set completely blind. Villeneuve recalled his first day shooting with the actor: "He entered the room, and he could not see at all. He was walking with an assistant very slowly. It was like seeing Jesus walking into a temple. Everybody became super silent, and there was a kind of sacred moment. Everyone was in awe. It was so beautiful and powerful—I was moved to tears."

A raft of mostly young actors comprise Blade Runner 2049s supporting cast; David Dastmalchian, Sylvia Hoeks, Carla Juri, Mackenzie Davis and Barkhad Abdi were lesser-known stars with years of expertise in indie cinema. Among the few exceptions are Dave Bautista, Hiam Abbass and Lennie James, whose castings were revealed between April and July 2016, and Robin Wright, assigned to one of three major female roles in Blade Runner 2049. Wright's participation had been rumored for weeks, but was not immediately confirmed by the filmmakers because her existing duties to Netflix's political TV thriller House of Cards momentarily stalled the negotiations.

Filming 

The filmmakers embarked on location scouting in April 2016, and principal photography of Blade Runner 2049 commenced that July, lasting four months until November. They first toured London but found no soundstage available for the needs of the production. As a result, Deakins and Villeneuve flew to Hungary for location scouting partly due to Scott's familiarity with the country's network of facilities. They also toured Slovakia to source architectural ideas. Blade Runner 2049 production crew were mostly Hungarian, with some American staff hired to supervise the set. Inserts with Wright and Hoeks were the first scenes filmed on set. Shooting took place mainly at Korda Studios and the Origo Studios backlot in suburban Budapest, where the shoot qualified for a 25% tax rebate on in-state costs from the Hungarian government.

The Alcon–Sony partnership allocated $180million ($90million each) for the budget, rebates notwithstanding. Interior shots of the Budapest Stock Exchange's Liberty Square palace doubled for Las Vegas in casino-set scenes, and abandoned Soviet industrial sites such as the abandoned Inota and Kelenföld power plants were important filming locations that emphasized Blade Runner 2049 dystopian ethos. The Budapest palace was the film's largest set, occupying at least three floors of the building. Filmmakers revised Deckard's capture by Luv into a simple conversational scene after Ford conveyed to Kosove and Johnson his disapproval of the dialogue.

Pitfalls occasionally beset the production. The filmmakers frequently fell behind schedule, and an Origo Studios-employed subcontractor was killed by falling debris when dismantling one of the sets. Gosling's obligation to fulfill a New York City press junket for La La Land (2016) exacerbated the unusual circumstances of the shoot; however, his scenes were able to be filmed in time for the Thanksgiving holiday.

Cinematography 
Blade Runner 2049 is the third Deakins–Villeneuve collaboration after Prisoners and Sicario (2015). Together with production designer Dennis Gassner, the men brainstormed ideas for the film's visual palette as Villeneuve was editing his science fiction drama Arrival (2016). The sequences were then storyboarded and left for Deakins and Villeneuve to execute. The two were inspired by the architecture of several global cities to develop a hostile, imposing brutalist style for their fictionalized Los Angeles, among them the appearance of Beijing's cityscape in dense smog, the foothills of southern Spain, Bangladeshi shipyards, and certain mid-twentieth century landmarks in London (such as the Barbican Estate and Trellick Tower). For Las Vegas-set scenes, the filmmakers researched intense dust storms in the Sahara, Saudi Arabia and Sydney to replicate the sandy desert ruins Villeneuve sought.

It became apparent to Deakins that Blade Runner 2049 would be one of his biggest undertakings because of the technical demands involved in realizing the onscreen universe. Deakins exercises full artistic control of his shoots, and the extent of his oversight meant a single-camera setup for the set—the British cinematographer rejected a studio line producer's request for a nine unit-camera setup because he firmly believed said technique would yield sloppy camerawork. Rather, he and Villeneuve reprised the practical approach of their previous collaborations to capture the Blade Runner 2049 scenes. They shot the project in 1.55:1 aspect ratio from a single Arri Alexa XT Studio camera with Zeiss Master prime lenses, assisted with an attached crane arm or a dolly. The filmmakers conducted tests with an Alexa 65 camera but preferred the XT Studio's somewhat grainy image quality, and the choice of lenses corresponded to the scale and lighting specifications of the scenes. For example, close-up character scenes were captured in 32mm lenses, but filmmakers captured sweeping cityscape shots with 14mm and 16mm lenses. Occasionally, Arri Alexa Mini cameras were used to represent views from the spinners, the vehicles used in the film.

When Gassner was first approached for Blade Runner 2049, he was called with a request from Villeneuve to observe the shape of passing street sweepers. The designer had known Scott since 1982, when they first collaborated for the Francis Ford Coppola-directed musical One From the Heart. Redesigning the spinners then became one of his initial responsibilities. He and the filmmakers envisioned a harsh, angular design for the spinners, one intended to evoke the sense of technological innovation. It was also up to Gassner to complete most of the Blade Runner 2049 sets so producers could exercise full artistic control of the shoot. Gassner described the process as especially difficult as design elements had to be distinct but lore-faithful, with everything executed under a tight shooting schedule.

Costumes 
Costume designer Renée April produced costumes featuring fake fur, painted cotton disguised as shearling, and breathing masks. April initially researched the fashion styles of the 1960s and 1970s, but elected to research various decades for influence as well as both Eastern and Western culture. When discussing the film, she stated she did not consider it a fashionable one. "I made costumes for the dark, wet, polluted, miserable world that Denis [Villeneuve] created. I had to hold myself back and remove anything too avant-garde or outré because it did not help the story. There were no superhero suits because the world needed to be realistic, and the characters relatable." When April discussed the film with Villeneuve about what direction she should take the costumes, Villeneuve told her "brutal", a similar description he gave to Gassner. "So I took it from there and made it tougher. Also, we did not want to do something science-fiction. We wanted to do it realistic. I did not want costumes with [lots of] zippers and plastic. So my job was to make the characters believable."

Post-production 
Warner Bros. announced in early October 2016 that the film would be titled Blade Runner 2049. Editing commenced in December in Los Angeles, with the intention of having the film being rated R. At the 2017 San Diego Comic-Con, Villeneuve said that the film would run for two hours and 32 minutes. There originally existed a four-hour early cut of the film that Villeneuve described "quite strong" but also at times "too self-indulgent". He prefers the shorter final version that he describes as "more elegant" and which Ridley Scott still described as too long. Villeneuve says he will not show the four-hour cut to anyone. As with Skyfall, cinematographer Roger Deakins created his own IMAX master of the film rather than using the proprietary "DMR" process that IMAX usually uses with films not shot with IMAX cameras.

Music 

Rapper-producer El-P said he was asked to compose music for the first Blade Runner 2049 trailer, but his score was "rejected or ignored". Jóhann Jóhannsson, who had worked with Villeneuve on Prisoners, Sicario and Arrival, was initially announced as composer for the film. However, Villeneuve and Jóhannsson decided to end the collaboration because Villeneuve thought the film "needed something different", and also that he "needed to go back to something closer to Vangelis's soundtrack" of the first film. Composers Hans Zimmer and Benjamin Wallfisch joined the project in July 2017. In September, Jóhannsson's agent confirmed that he was no longer involved and was contractually forbidden from commenting. The musical cue during the final scene, "Tears in the Rain", is a call-back to the "Tears in rain" scene from Blade Runner which saw the death of the film's central antagonist Roy Batty. The track is a reimagined version of the original Vangelis work.

Release

Theatrical 

Blade Runner 2049 premiered on October 3, 2017, at the Dolby Theatre in Los Angeles, although following the 2017 Las Vegas Strip shooting, the red carpet events were canceled prior to the screening. It was the opening feature at the Festival du nouveau cinéma in Montreal the following day. It also was premiered in Switzerland at the Zurich Film Festival on October 4, 2017. Sony Pictures Releasing, which had obtained rights to release the film in overseas territories, was the first to release Blade Runner 2049 in theaters, first in France and Belgium on October 4, 2017, then in other countries on the two following days. The film was released by Warner Bros. in North America on October 6, 2017. In addition to standard 2D and 3D formats, Blade Runner 2049 was released in IMAX theaters. Also, Alcon Entertainment partnered with Oculus VR to create and distribute content for the film exclusively for its virtual reality format and launched it alongside the theatrical release of October 6, 2017. That content would later be referred to as Blade Runner: Revelations. Due to the popularity and preference of IMAX in 2D (as opposed to 3D) among filmgoers in North America, the film was shown in IMAX theaters in only 2D domestically, but was screened in 3D formats internationally. Just like Skyfall, the movie was specially formatted for IMAX at the expanded aspect ratio of 1.9:1. The film is rated R by the Motion Picture Association of America for "violence, some sexuality, nudity, and language".

Some scenes in the film that featured nudity were censored in Turkey. This decision received criticism from the country's film critics.

Marketing 
Warner Bros. and Columbia Pictures jointly released an announcement teaser on December 19, 2016. A selection of excerpts (lasting 15 seconds) were released as a trailer tease on May 5, 2017, in the lead up to the full trailer, which was released on May 8, 2017. A second trailer was released on July 17, 2017.

Short films 
Three short films were made to explore events that occur in the 30 years between Blade Runner 2049 and Blade Runner, set in 2019:
 2036: Nexus Dawn is directed by Luke Scott, and follows Niander Wallace as he presents a new Nexus-9 replicant to lawmakers in an attempt to have a prohibition on replicants lifted. The short film also stars Benedict Wong as one of the lawmakers.
 2048: Nowhere to Run, also directed by Scott, follows Sapper Morton as he protects a mother and daughter from thugs.
 Blade Runner Black Out 2022, is an anime directed by Shinichirō Watanabe wherein a rogue replicant named Iggy carries out an operation to detonate a nuclear warhead over Los Angeles, triggering an electromagnetic pulse that erases the Tyrell Corporation's database of registered replicants. Edward James Olmos reprises his role as Gaff in this film. Flying Lotus composed the soundtrack; Watanabe had used his music as a temp score in making a rough cut of the short.

Home media 
The film was released on DVD, Blu-ray, Blu-ray 3D, and 4K Blu-ray on January 16, 2018. It made approximately $29million in US physical home media sales.

Reception

Box office 
Blade Runner 2049 grossed $92.1million in the United States and Canada, and $175.4million in other territories, for a worldwide total of $267.5million, against a production budget between $150–185million. The projected worldwide total the film needed to gross in order to break even was estimated to be around $400million, and in November 2017 The Hollywood Reporter wrote that the film was expected to lose the studio as much as $80million. Ridley Scott attributed the film's underperformance to the runtime, saying: "It's slow. Long. Too long. I would have taken out half an hour."

In the United States and Canada, the film was initially projected to gross $43–47million in its opening weekend. In September 2017, a survey from Fandango indicated that the film was one of the most anticipated releases of the season. It made $4million from Thursday night previews, including $800,000 from IMAX theaters, but just $12.6million on its first day, lowering weekend estimates to $32million. It made $11.3million on Saturday and went on to debut to $31.5million, performing below both projections but still finishing first at the box office and marking the biggest openings of Villeneuve and Gosling's careers. Regarding the opening weekend, director Villeneuve said, "It's a mystery. All the indexes and marketing tools they were using predicted that it would be a success. The film was acclaimed by critics. So everyone expected the first weekend's results to be impressive, and they were shocked. They still don't understand."

Deadline Hollywood attributed the film's performance to the 163-minute runtime limiting the number of showtimes theaters could have, lack of appeal to mainstream audiences, and the marketing being vague and relying on nostalgia and established fanbase to carry it. In its second weekend, the film dropped 52.7% to $15.5million, finishing second behind newcomer Happy Death Day ($26million) and dropped another 54% in its third weekend to $7.2million, finishing in 4th behind Boo 2! A Madea Halloween, Geostorm and Happy Death Day.

Overseas, it was expected to debut to an additional $60million, for a worldwide opening of around $100million. The debut ended up making $50.2million internationally, finishing number one in 45 markets, for a global opening of $81.7million. It made $8million in the United Kingdom, $4.9million in Russia, $1.8million in Brazil and $3.6million in Australia. It debuted in China on October 27, and made $7.7million in its opening weekend, which was considered a disappointment.

Critical response 

Blade Runner 2049 was well received by the American press, and various US publications included the film in their end-of-2017 lists. Critical reviews compared the sequel favorably to Blade Runner as a worthy successor advancing the franchise mythos, though some were conflicted over the pacing and tonal shifts of the story, and the film drew occasional disapproval from reviewers who felt it lacked the spectacle and dramatic depth of its predecessor. The film's craftsmanship was the main source of praise from journalists, who routinely singled out Villeneuve for his expertise: The New York Times A. O. Scott viewed Blade Runner 2049 as an introspection of Villeneuve's own sensibilities, the product of a director exuding an "unnerving calm", while San Francisco Chronicle Mick LaSalle said the film seemed to employ a similar narrative tone to the director's late period films such as Arrival. The Villeneuve–Deakins collaboration was noted for the creation of cinematography displaying "the kind of complex artistry one would expect from the profession's top veteran", with Deakins' work described as "bleakly beautiful". Other aspects of Blade Runner 2049, such as the set design, writing, and scoring, were cited among the strengths of the film.

The actors' performances were a principal topic of discussion among critics. Critiques of the dynamic of the cast were positive in the media, and reviewers often distinguished Gosling, Ford and Wright for further praise. Gosling's work was described as "superb, soulful", and he was considered physically convincing as a replicant in his expression and appearance. Meanwhile, critics from The Hollywood Reporter and from Empire magazine were among those who believed Ford worked a career-best performance. Other journalists, such as Peter Travers of Rolling Stone, viewed the two men as "double dynamite" in conversational scenes, in which the film assumes "a resonance that is both tragic and hopeful". One particular point of contention in Blade Runner 2049 was characterization: some critics, for example, saw K's romance with Joi as an idea of unrealized potential because the film explores their relationship only superficially, so Joi never seems to develop into a fleshed out character. Some criticized the film's depiction of its female characters as being too submissive.

The fate of K in the closing scenes of the film has been a matter of debate; some critics have suggested that his demise is open to interpretation, as it is not explicitly stated in the film that K has died. In an interview with Entertainment Weekly, screenwriter Michael Green expressed surprise that K's death had been called into question, referring to the use of the "Tears in rain" musical motif in the final scene.

The question of whether Deckard is a human or a replicant has been an ongoing controversy since the original release of Blade Runner. Ridley Scott has stated that Deckard was a replicant. However, others, including Harrison Ford, disagree, and feel preserving the ambiguity of Deckard's status important to the film. Blade Runner 2049 draws no conclusion to this debate. During various physical struggles, Deckard showed no sign of artificial replicant strength; however, Gaff described Deckard to K as "retired"; and replicant maker Niander Wallace tells Deckard that "You are a wonder to me, Mr. Deckard," and that he might have been "designed" to fall in love with Rachael.

On review aggregator Rotten Tomatoes, the film has an approval rating of 88% based on 444 reviews, with an average rating of 8.30/10. The website's critical consensus reads, "Visually stunning and narratively satisfying, Blade Runner 2049 deepens and expands its predecessor's story while standing as an impressive filmmaking achievement in its own right." As of May 2021, Metacritic gives the film a weighted average score of 81 out of 100 based on 54 reviews, indicating "universal acclaim". Critics who saw the film before its release were asked by Villeneuve not to reveal certain characters and plot points. Audiences polled by CinemaScore gave the film an average grade of "A−" on an A+ to F scale, while PostTrak reported filmgoers gave it a 78% overall positive score and a 60% "definite recommend".

Social commentary 
Reviewing the film for Vice, Charlotte Gush was critical of its portrayal of women, who she said were "either prostitutes, holographic housewives" or victims dying brutal deaths. While acknowledging that "misogyny was part of the dystopia" in Scott's 1982 original, she stated that the sequel was "eye-gougingly sexist". Writing for The Guardian, Anna Smith expressed similar concerns, stating that "sexualised images of women dominate the stunning futuristic cityscapes" and questioned whether the film catered heavily to heterosexual men. Sara Stewart, of the New York Post, entitled her review "You'll love the new Blade Runner — unless you're a woman". Rachael Kaines of Moviepilot countered that "the gender politics in Blade Runner 2049 are intentional": "The movie is about secondary citizens. Replicants. Orphans. Women. Slaves. Just by depicting these secondary citizens in subjugation doesn't mean that it is supportive of these depictions – they are a condemnation." Helen Lewis of the New Statesman suggested that the film is "an uneasy feminist parable about controlling the means of reproduction" and that "its villain, Niander Wallace, is consumed by rage that women can do something he cannot":

Fertility is the perfect theme for the dystopia of Blade Runner 2049 because of the western elite anxiety that over-educated, over-liberated women are having fewer children or choosing to opt-out of childbearing altogether. (One in five women is now childless by the age of 45; the rates are higher among women who have been to university.) Feminism is one potential solution to this problem: removing the barriers which make women feel that motherhood is a closing of doors. Another is to take flight and find another exploitable class to replace human females ... Maybe androids don't dream of electric sheep, but some human men certainly dream of electric wombs.

In an interview with Vanity Fair, Denis Villeneuve responded that he is very sensitive about his portrayal of women: "Blade Runner is not about tomorrow; it's about today. And I'm sorry, but the world is not kind on women." Quoting from the Variety magazine breakdown of viewer demographics for the film, Donald Clarke for The Irish Times indicated that female audiences seemed alienated from it; just 8% of its audiences were females under 25. Esquire magazine commented on the controversial aspects of the sex scene — involving K, the holographic Joi and replicant Mariette — calling it a "robo-ménage à trois", and contrasted it with the sex scene between Joaquin Phoenix and Scarlett Johansson in Her (2013).

Mackenzie Davis, who portrayed Mariette, argued for the self-awareness of the film's social commentary in an interview with the website Refinery29. Asked how she believed Blade Runner 2049 "differs [from Blade Runner] in its portrayal of women", Davis responded:
I think it’s pretty self-aware about a pornographic economy that has reduced the roles of women to sheer consumption. The normalization of women’s roles as things to be consumed, there’s products that are made, just like there are now, the idea of the semi-sentient sex doll is really in line with what’s going on in this Blade Runner universe, about having a thing that fulfills everything you want, but doesn’t talk back and can’t argue with you, but can be a loving, supporting companion and also fulfill all your sexual needs feels like something that’s very contemporary and something the movie is very self-aware about. And then I think that there are female roles in different castes of this society that are able to be more embodied and powerful in conventional ways, and also have cracks in their facade where you see their vulnerabilities. But it seems like this world is so dependent on this caste system of humans perform these roles; replicants perform these roles, human superiors, creators, and those are the ways that women sort of travel between. But there isn’t a lot of upward mobility. Other outlets also noted the film's depiction of environmental issues and the impacts of climate change. Science fiction author Matthew Kressel told the BBC he thought that "the environmental collapse the film so vividly depicts is not too far off from where we are today". A 2013 image of air pollution in Beijing was also compared to a still from the film.

Accolades 
Blade Runner 2049 has received numerous awards and nominations. At the 90th Academy Awards, it was nominated for five awards, winning Best Cinematography for Deakins, and Best Visual Effects for John Nelson, Gerd Nefzer, Paul Lambert and Richard R. Hoover. At the 71st British Academy Film Awards, it received eight nominations, including Best Director, and won for Best Cinematography and Best Special Visual Effects. At the 23rd Critics' Choice Awards, it was nominated for seven awards, winning for Best Cinematography.

Future

Potential sequels 
During the promotional tour for the 2015 film The Martian, Scott expressed interest in making additional Blade Runner films. In October 2017, Villeneuve said that he expected a third film would be made if 2049 was successful. Fancher, who wrote both films, said he was considering reviving an old story idea involving Deckard traveling to another country. Ford said that he would be open to returning if he liked the script. In January 2018, Scott stated that he had "another [story] ready to evolve and be developed, [that] there is certainly one to be done for sure", referring to a third Blade Runner film.

In January 2020, Villeneuve expressed interest in "revisit[ing] this universe in a different way," making "something disconnected from both other movies," as opposed to a direct sequel.

Blade Runner 2099 
In November 2021, Scott announced that a Blade Runner TV series was in the works. In February 2022, it was announced that the series, Blade Runner 2099, was in development at Alcon Entertainment and Amazon Studios. It will be set fifty years after the events of 2049. Scott will serve as executive producer and potentially direct the series while Silka Luisa will serve as showrunner.

See also 
 Total Recall 2070
 Artificial intelligence
 Cyberpunk
 List of films featuring drones

Notes

References

External links 

 
 
 

2017 3D films
2017 action thriller films
2010s mystery films
2017 psychological thriller films
2017 science fiction action films
Alcon Entertainment films
American 3D films
American action thriller films
American detective films
American dystopian films
American mystery films
American neo-noir films
American science fiction action films
American science fiction thriller films
American sequel films
Android (robot) films
BAFTA winners (films)
Blade Runner
Biorobotics in fiction
Climate change films
Columbia Pictures films
Cyberpunk films
Environmental films
Fictional portrayals of the Los Angeles Police Department
Films about altered memories
Films about artificial intelligence
Films about genetic engineering
Films based on works by Philip K. Dick
Films directed by Denis Villeneuve
Films scored by Benjamin Wallfisch
Films scored by Hans Zimmer
Films set in 2049
Films set in the future
Films set in California
Films set in Los Angeles
Films set in the Las Vegas Valley
Films shot in Budapest
Films shot in Hungary
Films that won the Best Visual Effects Academy Award
Films whose cinematographer won the Best Cinematography Academy Award
Films with screenplays by Michael Green (writer)
Flying cars in fiction
Holography in films
IMAX films
Postmodern films
Scott Free Productions films
Transhumanism in film
Warner Bros. films
2010s American films